Alvaro Farinacci (born September 11, 1944) is a Canadian politician. Elected as a municipal councillor for the first time back in 1983, Farinacci quickly succeeded in gaining the confidence of the Mayor and Council, as reflected in his appointment to the Executive Committee the following year. Due to his vast experience as a certified real estate broker and member of the board of directors of the Montreal Real Estate Board for 17 years, he was entrusted with the responsibility of a number of matters relating to urban development. At the same time, Mr. Farinacci also held various other positions over those years, including chairman of the Commission de l'aménagement du territoire et du développement économique (land use planning and economic development committee), member of the Comité de toponymie (toponymy committee) and, for 16 years, was a member of LaSalle's Comité consultatif d'urbanisme (urban planning advisory committee), where he in fact served as that committee's first chairman.

Farinacci also very significantly contributed to LaSalle's economic growth. He was a founding member of the Corporation de développement économique de LaSalle (CDEL) in 1984 and then served as CDEL's chairman for a number of years. He was also one of the founders of the Comité de sécurité industrielle (committee on safety in the workplace). Recalling that the Mayor had given him the mandate "to develop a structure designed to arouse interest in order to promote and attract investments to LaSalle", Alvaro Farinacci mentioned how very proud he was of his contribution to the birth of CDEL, "which was one of the biggest successes in the history of LaSalle".
From 2001 to 2013, he was a Council member of the Communauté métropolitaine de Montréal, which greatly benefited from his real estate experience and expertise, entrusting him with the position of vice-chairman of the Commission permanente du logement social (standing committee on social housing). At the present time, he is a member of Ville de Montréal's Commission sur le développement économique et urbain et l'habitation (committee on economic and urban development and housing).

A certified real estate agent for 40 years, a businessman actively involved in his community, Alvaro Farinacci has also played a major role in LaSalle's community and cultural life, for instance, as a member of the board of directors of Centre culturel Henri-Lemieux and the Fondation de l'Hôpital LaSalle, where he was a board member and vice-chairman for 25 years.

References

1944 births
Businesspeople from Montreal
Canadian real estate agents
Italian emigrants to Canada
Living people
Montreal city councillors
People from LaSalle, Quebec